Paraleleupidia is a genus of beetles in the family Carabidae, containing the following species:

 Paraleleupidia acutangula Basilewsky & Mateu, 1977 
 Paraleleupidia besucheti Mateu, 1981 
 Paraleleupidia bueana Basilewsky & Mateu, 1977 
 Paraleleupidia bunyakira Basilewsky, 1955 
 Paraleleupidia bururiana Basilewsky, 1953 
 Paraleleupidia camerunensis Basilewsky & Mateu, 1977 
 Paraleleupidia castanea Basilewsky & Mateu, 1977 
 Paraleleupidia celisi Basilewsky, 1964 
 Paraleleupidia cribrata (Basilewsky, 1951) 
 Paraleleupidia decellei Basilewsky, 1962 
 Paraleleupidia exarata Basilewsky, 1960 
 Paraleleupidia franzi Basilewsky, 1964 
 Paraleleupidia joannae Basilewsky, 1962 
 Paraleleupidia laticollis Basilewsky, 1953 
 Paraleleupidia linearis Baehr, 1990 
 Paraleleupidia loebli Mateu, 1981 
 Paraleleupidia mirei Basilewsky & Mateu, 1977 
 Paraleleupidia montana Basilewsky & Mateu, 1977 
 Paraleleupidia nimbana (Basilewsky, 1953) 
 Paraleleupidia nyakagerana Basilewsky, 1956 
 Paraleleupidia penalis Basilewsky & Mateu, 1977

References

Dryptinae